Adam the Welshman (c. 1130 – 1181) was a Welsh theologian and Bishop of St Asaph from 14 October 1175 until his death.

Many sources have assumed Adam the Welshman and Adam of Balsham to be the same person, although Raymond Klibansky concludes that they were two different men.

References 

1130s births
1181 deaths
Bishops of St Asaph
Welsh theologians
Medieval Welsh theologians
12th-century Welsh people
12th-century English Roman Catholic bishops
12th-century Roman Catholic theologians
12th-century Welsh writers